Michael David Minor (born December 26, 1987) is an American professional baseball pitcher who is a free agent. He was drafted by the Atlanta Braves with the seventh overall pick in the 2009 MLB draft. He has played in Major League Baseball (MLB) for the Kansas City Royals, Texas Rangers, Oakland Athletics, and Cincinnati Reds.

Early life
Minor had an outstanding high school career at Forrest School in Chapel Hill, Tennessee and was drafted in the 13th round of the 2006 Major League Baseball Draft by the Tampa Bay Devil Rays after his senior season. However, he did not sign, choosing to attend Vanderbilt University.

College career
Minor played at Vanderbilt University with fellow future first round draft picks Pedro Alvarez and David Price.

Awards and honors

 2007 Collegiate Baseball Freshman All-American
 2007 Rivals.com Freshman All-American
 2007 SEC All-Freshman Team
 2007 SEC Freshman of the Year
 2007 Second Team All-SEC
 2008 Best pitcher Haarlem Baseball Week
 2008 National Collegiate Baseball Writers Association Second Team Pre-season All-America Team
 2009 Louisville Slugger Second Team Pre-season All-American
 2009 National Collegiate Baseball Writers Association Second Team Pre-season All-America Team
 2009 SEC Pitcher of the Week – Week 8

United States National Team
Minor pitched for the United States National Team (Collegiate) in 2007 and 2008.

One highlight of the 2008 season was his earning the 4–1 win over Cuba in the championship game of the Haarlem Baseball Week tournament in The Netherlands. This victory marked the first time in recorded history that a United States Collegiate National Team has defeated the Cuba Olympic Team in a tournament title game. In the 2008 World University Baseball Championship held in Brno, Czech Republic, Minor led Team USA to its third gold medal alongside Stephen Strasburg. In the tournament, he was 1–0 with a 1.15 ERA and 16 strikeouts, allowing eight hits in 15 innings for Team USA. In 2008, he was named Baseball Americas Summer Player of the Year.

Professional career

Atlanta Braves
Minor was drafted by the Atlanta Braves in the first round (seventh overall) in the 2009 Major League Baseball draft and represented the United States in the 2010 All-Star Futures Game.

Minor made his major-league debut on August 9, 2010 against the Houston Astros. He recorded his first strikeout against Chris Johnson. On the night, he went six innings giving up five hits and four runs (three earned) while walking one and striking out five batters; he got a no-decision. In his next start on August 17, 2010, Minor went six innings giving up five hits and two earned runs and got his first major league victory. Then, in his third career start against the Chicago Cubs, Minor went six innings giving up three earned runs while striking out 12 and earning his second career victory. Those 12 strikeouts set an Atlanta Braves rookie strikeout record in a single game; surpassing Tommy Hanson's 11 strikeouts in 2009. On August 18, 2011, in a game against the San Francisco Giants, Minor pitched six scoreless innings including facing the minimum number of batters over the last four innings. This victory was the first time in 17 major league starts that Minor did not give up a run.

On May 25, 2013, Minor hit his first career home run off Dillon Gee of the New York Mets in a 6–0 win.

On August 22, 2014, Minor pitched  no-hit innings, before giving up an RBI single to the Reds' Billy Hamilton. The Braves eventually won the game in the 12th inning on Justin Upton's two-run home run. Minor finished the 2014 season with a 6–12 record and 4.77 ERA, pitching most of the year with a sore shoulder.

In 2015, Minor became the first Brave since John Rocker in 2001 to challenge the team in an arbitration hearing. He won and was awarded $5.6 million. On March 3, 2015, Minor again began feeling tightness in his shoulder and was diagnosed with rotator cuff inflammation. As a result, he was placed on the disabled list on March 10. Minor attempted to start throwing programs in mid-March and early April, but felt discomfort both times. He was moved to the 60-day disabled list on May 2. Eleven days later, Minor underwent surgery for a torn labrum, and missed the rest of the season.

Minor became a free agent on December 2, 2015, when the Braves opted not to tender him a contract.

Kansas City Royals
Minor signed a two-year contract with the Kansas City Royals worth $7.25 million with a club option worth $10 million for the 2018 season on February 19, 2016. 
Minor started the 2016 season on the disabled list. The Royals planned for Minor to return in the second half of the season, but persistent fatigue and discomfort in his shoulder forced Minor to stay on the disabled list for the rest of the season.

Because of his troubles staying healthy, the Royals announced that Minor would pitch out of the bullpen in 2017. A move to relief brought tremendous results for Minor, who saw his average fastball velocity climb to nearly 95 miles per hour, compared to 91 miles per hour as a starter. Minor would emerge as one of the Royals best relievers, finishing with a 2.55 ERA and six saves, with 88 strikeouts in 77 innings. Despite his success out of the bullpen, Minor returned to starting in 2018.

Texas Rangers
On December 4, 2017, Minor signed with the Texas Rangers to a three-year, $28 million deal. In 2018, Minor went 12–8 with a 4.18 ERA and 110 strikeouts in 157 innings.

In 2019, after posting an MLB-leading 2.40 ERA in his first 17 starts, Minor was selected as an American League pitcher for the 2019 Major League Baseball All-Star Game. However, because he was scheduled to start the Sunday before the All-Star Game, he did not play. Minor finished the 2019 season after going 14–10 with a 3.59 ERA and 200 strikeouts over  innings. Minor finished 8th in the 2019 AL Cy Young Award voting.

Oakland Athletics
On August 31, 2020, Minor was traded to the Oakland Athletics in exchange for Dustin Harris and Marcus Smith.

Return to Kansas City
On December 1, 2020, Minor signed a two-year, $18 million contract to return to the Kansas City Royals, with a $13 million club option for the 2023 season and a $1 million buyout.

In 2021, Minor posted an 8–12 record with a 5.05 ERA and 149 strikeouts over  innings in 28 starts.

Cincinnati Reds
On March 16, 2022, Minor was traded to the Cincinnati Reds in exchange for LHP Amir Garrett.

Pitch repertoire
Minor leads with a four-seam fastball at 89–93 mph, a pitch he throws more than half the time. In relatively equal amounts he throws a slider (83–86), a circle change (82–84), and a knuckle curve (77–80). Left-handed hitters rarely see the changeup, especially with two strikes. The curve has a whiff rate of 39% over Minor's career. He has produced one of the league's lowest ground ball/fly ball ratios since he debuted.

References

External links

 Mike Minor Bio at VUCommodores.com

1987 births
Living people
People from Chapel Hill, Tennessee
Baseball players from Tennessee
Major League Baseball pitchers
American League All-Stars
Atlanta Braves players
Kansas City Royals players
Texas Rangers players
Oakland Athletics players
Cincinnati Reds players
Vanderbilt Commodores baseball players
Rome Braves players
Peoria Saguaros players
Mississippi Braves players
Gwinnett Braves players
Pan American Games silver medalists for the United States
Pan American Games medalists in baseball
Baseball players at the 2007 Pan American Games
Medalists at the 2007 Pan American Games